Robert Samuel Smith (6 September 1925 – 30 March 2001) was a British ice hockey player. He competed in the men's tournament at the 1948 Winter Olympics.

References

1925 births
2001 deaths
Ice hockey players at the 1948 Winter Olympics
Olympic ice hockey players of Great Britain
Scottish ice hockey left wingers
Sportspeople from Kirkcaldy